Narunga may refer to:

 Tenarunga (also called Narunga), an atoll in French Polynesia
 Narungga, a group of Australian Aboriginals